This article contains the list of candidates associated with the 1996 Russian presidential election.

Registered candidates

Withdrawn candidates

Rejected candidates
78 voter initiative groups were authorized by the Central Election Commission to collect signatures. However, only seventeen candidates managed to submit petitions with one million signatures by the deadline on April 16. Six of these were rejected by the Central Election Commission.

Sergei Mavrodi, Head of MMM investment fund
Vladimir Podoprigora
Galina Starovoytova, leader of Democratic Russia, had turned in her petition the day before the deadline. Her candidacy was rejected due to irregularities with signatures. Unsuccessfully appealed to Supreme Court.
Artyom Tarasov, millionaire businessman, candidacy rejected due to irregularities with signatures. Unsuccessfully appealed to Supreme Court.
Lev Ubozhko, leader of the Conservative Party. Candidacy was rejected due to irregularities with signatures. Unsuccessfully appealed to Supreme court.
Viacheslav Ushakov, President of the Moscow Investment Foundation Joint Stock Company. Candidacy was rejected due to irregularities with signatures. Unsuccessfully appealed to Supreme Court.

Declared candidates who withdrew without registering

Other declared candidates
Stanislav Govorukhin, film director
Aleksandr Ivanov-Sukharevsky, founder and leader of People's National Party
Nikolai Lysenko, founder and leader of NPRP
Vladimir Shumeyko, former Chairman of the Federation Council

Possible candidates who did not run

The following individuals were included in some polls, were referred to in the media as possible candidates or had publicly expressed interest long before the elections but never announced that they would run.
Ramazan Abdulatipov, former Deputy Chairman of the Federation Council and Chairman of the Soviet of Nationalities; vice presidential candidate in 1991
Viktor Anpilov, politician and trade unionist
Sergey Baburin, Deputy of the State Duma
Vadim Bakatin, former Chairman of the KGB and Minister of Interior of the Soviet Union
Vladimir Bukovsky, activist (was urged to run)
Viktor Chernomyrdin
Yegor Gaidar, former Acting Prime Minister of Russia
Pavel Grachev, Minister of Defence
Boris Fyodorov
Ruslan Khasbulatov
Yury Kokov
Sergei Kovalev
Andrei Kozyrev, former Minister of Foreign Affairs
Filippovna Lakhova
Yury Luzhkov, Mayor of Moscow
Albert Makashov, Deputy of the State Duma
Ella Pamfilova
Gavriil Kharitonovich Popov, former Mayor of Moscow
Nikolai Ryzhkov, Deputy of the State Duma, former Chairman of the Council of Ministers, Head of the Economic Department of the Central Committee; Full member of the 26th and 27th Politburos, Member of the 25th Secretariat; Full member of the 26th, 27th, 28th of the Central Committee; presidential candidate in 1991
Eduard Rossel, member of the Federation Council
Ivan Rybkin
Vladimir Shcherbakov,
Sergey Shakhray, co-author of the Constitution of the Russian Federation and former Deputy Prime Minister
Alexander Shokhin, former Minister of Labour, Minister of the Economy, Deputy Chairman of the Government
Aleksandr Solzhenitsyn, author
Yury Skokov, leader of Congress of Russian Communities; former First Deputy Prime Minister of Russia and Secretary of the Security Council
Anatoly Sobchak, Mayor of Saint Petersburg
Oleg Soskovets
Nikolay Travkin
Arkady Volsky
Leonid Yakubovich, television personality

References

 
1996
1996 Russian presidential election